Garkain is a legendary creature in Australian Aboriginal mythology said to haunt the dense jungle along the Liverpool River in the Northern Territory, Australia. Should an unwary traveler enter his domain, Garkain swoops down from the trees on his leathery wings and envelops them. It is a story parents tell to their Australian children to tell them to not use physical violence as a way to solve problems.

After suffocating his victim with his foul stench, Garkain eats their flesh, leaving the intruder’s spirit to forever wander the vast jungle in search of their final resting place.

In popular culture
 The 1971 book The First Sunrise: Australian Aboriginal Myths in Paintings by artist Ainslie Roberts and anthropologist Charles P. Mountford contains the Aboriginal legend Garkain the Recluse. In 1957 Mountford donated a eucalyptus bark painting of Garkain (1948 or 1949) from the Gunbalanya Aboriginal community in western Arnhem Land to the Art Gallery of South Australia in Adelaide. 
 The 1990 novel Blood Wings by Stephen Gresham features Garkain haunting a small community on the edge of the Florida Everglades. 
 Garkain features  in the Penumbra role-playing game from Atlas Games.
 The Witcher video game series from CD Projekt Red features garkains as a type of vampire.
Garkain appears in several short stories including:
 Garkain (2009) by Samantha Henderson
 Garkain (2016) by Karl Brandt

See also
 Drop bear, a fictitious Australian mammal
 List of vampires in folklore and mythology

References 

Australian Aboriginal legendary creatures
Australian Aboriginal words and phrases